Sensory Deprivation is the debut studio album of Benestrophe, released in 1994 by Ras Dva Records.

Reception
Sonic Boom gave Sensory Deprivation a positive review and said "most modern electronic bands tend to use nonsensical lyrics but Benestrophe has a definite issue which it is trying to pass along to  listeners and that message is one shared by other artists in this genre; vivisection must be stopped."

Track listing

Personnel
Adapted from the Sensory Deprivation liner notes.

Mentallo & The Fixer
 Dwayne Dassing – programming, recording, engineering, mixing
 Gary Dassing – programming, recording, engineering, mixing, cover art, illustrations
 Richard Mendez – vocals

Production and design
 Ric Laciak – cover art, illustrations
 Chris Spoonts – remastering

Release history

References

External links 
 
 Sensory Deprivation at Bandcamp
 Sensory Deprivation at iTunes

1994 debut albums
Benestrophe albums
Alfa Matrix albums